Frans Weisz (born 23 July 1938) is a Dutch film director. He has directed more than 30 films since 1964. His 1975 film Red Sien was entered into the 9th Moscow International Film Festival. His film Havinck was screened in the Un Certain Regard section the 1988 Cannes Film Festival. His 1993 film The Betrayed was entered into the 43rd Berlin International Film Festival.

Weisz is Jewish. During the war he was hiding with his parents on a farm in Limburg. They were discovered, Frans managed to escape but his parents were captured. They were transported to Auschwitz concentration camp, his mother survived, his father did not.

Selected filmography
 A Gangstergirl (1966)
 The Burglar (1972)
 Red Sien (1975)
 Charlotte (1981)
 Havinck (1987)
 Leedvermaak (1989)
 The Betrayed (1993)
 Last Call (1995)
 Boy Ecury (2003)
 Life Is Wonderful'' (2018)

Awards
 2018 -  ShortCutz Amsterdam Career Award

References

External links

1938 births
Living people
Artists from Amsterdam
Dutch film directors
Dutch Jews
Golden Calf winners